Kim Bong-soo may refer to:
 Kim Bong-soo (tennis)
 Kim Bong-soo (footballer, born 1970)
 Kim Bong-soo (footballer, born 1999)